WJOB (1230 kHz) is a news/talk formatted AM radio station in Hammond, Indiana. The present tower of the station is 406 feet (124 Meters) tall and the station is a 24-hour operation transmitting with a power output of 1,000 watts.

1230 AM is a Class C local channel within the lower 48 states.

History

The beginning
The first license issued to this radio station—later moved to the Calumet Area—was on November 12, 1923, with Dr. George F. Courier and Lawrence J. "Butch" Crowley, a reputed Joliet mobster, as the licensees. The original callsign of this station was WWAE. The license was renewed on May 27, 1925, as Electric Park (Plainfield, Illinois) with L. J. Crowley as the sole licensee. A transmitter was then built at the Alamo Dance Hall in Joliet, Illinois.

The transmitter was later moved to 915 North Raynor Boulevard, Joliet with broadcasting facilities located at 321 Clinton Street, Joliet.

The broadcast facilities were moved shortly after that to the Hammond Douglas Park Area, where today it is known as Pulaski Park. A small studio was built on the northwest side of the park. From there, the broadcasting facilities were moved to a main studio at 402 Fayette Street, Fayette and Hohman Avenue, which today sits the former home of Bank Calumet (Calumet National Bank Building).

The WJOB era
It remained at that address until the station was sold to O.E. Richardson, Fred L. Adair, and Robert C. Adair, and the callsign was changed to the present WJOB on October 7, 1940. The new owners then moved the main studios to 449 State Street, above the Millikan Building, across from the Edward C. Minas Department Store, and the name of the corporation was changed to The South Shore Broadcasting Corporation.

It was during this time, that the station grew in popularity offering a variety of programming under the leadership of Sam Weller as the Programming Director. Some of the programs offered were the Happy Hour, which had a membership of 1,200 young members and was broadcast every Saturday morning from 10:30 to 11:30 under the direction of Mrs. O.E. Richardson, the wife of one of the owners. The new programming schedule was also included interesting programs in five foreign languages, including Eddie Oskierko of the Polish Musical Varieties Program, Cornelius Szakatis, of the Hungarian Hour, John Babinec of the Slovac Hour, Stella Lutefisk directing the Greek Hour, and Gilbert Vasquez as the director of the Spanish Program.

Included in this schedule of programming were Eddie Honesty of the "Rockin-In-Rhythm" program, the first black program on WJOB heard every Wednesday from 3:15 to 4 o’clock and also Saturday afternoons from 2 to 3 o’clock. Paul E. X. Brown, the only black newscaster in the country, was heard every Sunday at 10 a.m. Included in the programming were the Rev. Odell Reed, who conducted his services from 4635 State Street in Chicago, the first remote broadcast of radio station WJOB. Also included were Rev. William Carr and Clarence Parsons, with the Royal Quartet singing the well loved Negro spirituals.

One of the most popular shows of that era was the Sun-Dodgers show which featured daily from Midnight until 4 a.m. with Wayne Osborne as the announcer and Dave Erickson as its director. Not to be outdone, Women's programming was conducted by Miss Kitty Blake who produced the “It Happened in Hammond” program daily at 11:15 a.m. and Frances Benson read stories for children each Friday at 1:15 p.m. Also featured at the time were all Lake County High Schools who took part in the “High Schools On Parade Program” heard every Thursday.

The station remained at 449 State Street in downtown Hammond until May 5, 1956, when it erected a new tower and broadcasting facility at 6405 Olcott Avenue in the Woodmar section of Hammond where it remains there still today. In comportment with the information above, on YouTube one can listen to a 1959 broadcast of polka legend Li'l Wally Walter Jagiello performing at Club 505 in Hegewisch as aired on WJOB.

The 1960s
On December 30, 1960, the ownership of the station was sold to Julian Colby and became The Colby Broadcasting Corporation. Judy Grambo started a program called "The Ladies Program" and eventually became the President and Station Manager of WJOB. Mr. Colby and Ms. Grambo would guide the station to prominence for 26 years.

The 1970s-1990s
Until just before the end of the century, WJOB continued as a regional staple for local news and information. Personalities Larry Peterson, and later Thurm Ferree, Mike Bonaventura, Greg Doffin and others continued to provide quality local programming for WJOB's audience, just as did Irv Lewin until his 1995 death. As the 1990s drew to a close, however, WJOB floundered soon after M&M Broadcasting, owners for the past 13 years, ceded control of the station to George and Norma Stevens of St. George Broadcasting. Through staff changes, as it tried to continue to be relevant to local trends and demands, treasured local personalities were dismissed. By the early 2000s, WJOB had all but gone off the air.

The 2000s
The station was purchased by a partnership composed of Vazquez Development LLC and Ric Federighi in 2004. Several local and syndicated programming formats have aired. Steven 'The Preacher' Glover, hosted a very popular afternoon show.   The September 2008 Northwest Indiana flood catapulted WJOB back into the local consciousness with its 24-hour coverage of emergency evacuations and local leaders' messages to the public. WJOB continued to relay important notices about the flood and host several local leaders to give their views of the natural disaster. WJOB also revived its tradition of hosting politicians with its coverage of then Democratic candidate Barack Obama's rallies in Gary, Indiana and Highland, Indiana at Wicker Memorial Park. With this rebirth, WJOB recommitted itself to local broadcasting with nearly 90% local programming. Syndicated shows such as Dave Ramsey and Lou Dobbs would fill the remaining ten percent. Listener-assisted concepts such as the Citizens Traffic Authority and the Community Programming Initiative gave WJOB's local audience an unprecedented role in on-air participation. By the end of 2010, all syndicated programming had been forgone and live local programming became the station's focus. WJOB boasted nearly eighteen hours of live local programming with the remainder being dedicated to "Region Flashbacks," archived soundbites from previous shows. As of April 2012, WJOB reintroduced syndicated programming with The Mike Huckabee Show. WJOB continued as the "Sports Voice of the Region" with its dedication to local and Big Ten sports events and was one of the first local radio stations to broadcast WFA (Women's Football Association) games featuring the Chicago Force and Collegiate Baseball League baseball featuring the NWI Oilmen games. WJOB has been a member of the Purdue University Sports Broadcast Network since the 1960s and continues to broadcast Purdue football and men's basketball games in season. WJOB broadcasts over 150 local high school baseball, basketball, football, hockey, soccer, and softball games per calendar year, many produced in-house and some as an affiliate of the Regional Radio Sports Network

In February 2012, longtime host Steven "The Preacher" Glover died suddenly at his home.  The station, in addition to The Preacher's listeners, mourned his death, and the after-effects left the station in a quandary concerning the popular afternoon slot. In March 2012, comedian Nick Gaza was tapped to host the 4-6 p.m. show. The afternoon show underwent further change in September 2012, when Ron Harlow, Larry "the K," and 'Big' George Vincent split hosting duties on the renamed "The Afternoon Scramble." As of February 2013, the afternoon slot was filled with "The Afternoon Fix" hosted by Ron Harlow.

In the fall of 2013, WJOB re-joined the Indiana University Sports Radio Network, airing games that are non-conflicting with Purdue University Sports Radio Network broadcasts. Also in the fall of 2013, WJOB began broadcasting out-of-market NFL games and out-of-market NCAA Football games. The studio is located in the Purdue Commercialization & Excellence Center, less than a mile south of the tower and broadcast facility.

Current ownership
The station is now owned by Vazquez Development LLC.

Former station personalities
John Whitaker, well-known WJOB sportscaster, is the only man in the country who made play by play broadcasts of Nine Tournament Basketball games in one day, without assistance. He set the record in 1944 and again in 1945. Other personalities who worked at WJOB early in their careers include Jean Shepherd, Frank Reynolds (later with ABC News), Emery King (later with NBC News, WBBM-TV and WDIV-TV), Steve King (later at WLS, now at WGN), Melissa McGurren (now morning traffic reporter for Eric & Kathy on WTMX) Tommy Williams, (formerly of WSCR 670) and Felicia Middlebrooks (now at WBBM).

References

External links
 WJOB OFFICIAL WEBSITE

Radio Locator Information for W284CY
A Short History of AM Radio Broadcast Pioneer WWAE, Electric Park Plainfield, Illinois

JOB
Radio stations established in 1923